The 2020 Formula Renault Eurocup was a multi-event motor racing championship for open-wheel, formula racing cars held across Europe. The championship featured drivers competing in 1.8 litre Formula Renault single-seat race cars that conform to the technical regulations of the championship. The 2020 season was the 30th and final season Eurocup Formula Renault organised by Renault Sport, as it merged with the Formula Regional European Championship for the 2021 season. The series visited nine circuits around Europe. The championship was won by Victor Martins, with ART Grand Prix taking the teams' title.

Teams and drivers
In September 2019, ART Grand Prix announced its intention to compete in the championship for the first time since 2003. Their bid was successful, with the team joining eight other teams from 2019.  On 3 July 2020 it was announced that Global Racing Service had withdrawn from the season due to the effects of the COVID-19 pandemic.

 Kush Maini was scheduled to compete for R-ace GP, but withdrew prior to the start of the season.
 Jackson Walls was scheduled to compete for Arden Motorsport, but did not appear at any rounds. He was replaced by Alex Quinn.
 Reece Ushijima was scheduled to compete for M2 Competition, but withdrew prior to the start of the season.
 Xavier Lloveras and Belén García were set to drive for Global Racing Service, but were left without a drive following the team's withdrawal.

Calendar
The provisional calendar for the 2020 season was announced on 11 September 2019.

On 15 May 2020, Renault Sport unveiled a new 10-round calendar, after multiple postponements and cancellations due to the COVID-19 pandemic. The revised calendar included races at Magny-Cours for the first time since 2010, as well as a return to Imola and Zandvoort, where the series had last raced in 2004 and 2000 respectively. The rounds at Monaco, the Hungaroring and Silverstone were not rescheduled and were absent from the revised calendar. On 25 September 2020, it was announced that the series would support the 2020 Emilia Romagna Grand Prix at Imola to make up for the loss of the Monaco round.

Results

Championship standings 

 Points system

Points were awarded to the top 10 classified finishers.

Drivers' championship 

Notes:

  – Half points were awarded for race 1, as less than 75% of the scheduled distance was completed.

Teams' championship 
For teams entering more than two cars only the two best-finishing cars are eligible to score points in the teams' championship.

Notes:
  – Half points were awarded for race 1, as less than 75% of the scheduled distance was completed.

References

External links
 

Formula Renault Eurocup
Formula Renault Eurocup
Formula Renault Eurocup
Eurocup
Renault Eurocup